Sacred Wonders of Britain is a British television documentary series that was first broadcast on BBC Two on 30 December 2013. The three-part series was presented by Neil Oliver. Computer-generated imagery was produced by Carbon Digital at MediaCityUK for the series, including the title sequence.

Episode list

Reception

Ratings
According to overnight figures, the first episode had 2.36 million viewers with 9.79% of the audience share. The second and third episodes had audience shares of 7.3%.

Critical reception
Lucy Mangan of The Guardian said the programme was "equally unafraid to be informative and meditative, which made it rather wonderful". The Daily Mirror called it a "towering spectacle of non-information" and was unconvinced by the series.

References

External links
 
 
 

2013 British television series debuts
2014 British television series endings
Television shows set in the United Kingdom
BBC high definition shows
BBC television documentaries
English-language television shows